Yanshan District is a former district of Beijing, located southwest of the city center, and was situated in the middle of Fangshan. It bordered Fangshan throughout on all four sides. It merged into the Fangshan in 1986.

References 

Fangshan District